Cascade, Cascades or Cascading may refer to:

Science and technology

Science
Cascade waterfalls, or series of waterfalls
 Cascade, the CRISPR-associated complex for antiviral defense (a protein complex)
 Cascade (grape), a type of fruit
 Biochemical cascade, a series of biochemical reactions, in which a product of the previous step is the substrate of the next
 Energy cascade, a process important in turbulent flow and drag by which kinetic energy is converted into heat
 Collision cascade, a set of nearby adjacent energetic collisions of atoms induced by an energetic particle in a solid or liquid
 Ecological cascade, a series of secondary extinctions triggered by the primary extinction of a key species in an ecosystem
 Trophic cascade, an interaction that can occur throughout an ecosystem when a trophic level is suppressed

Computing
 Cascading classifiers, a multistage classification scheme
 Cascading deletion, a way to handle deletions in database systems
 Cascading (software), an abstraction layer for Hadoop
 Cascading Style Sheets (CSS), style sheet language used in markup languages like HTML
 Cascade (computer virus), a type of computer virus in the 1980s
 Method cascading, in object-oriented languages

Engineering
 Cascade amplifier, any two-port network constructed from a series of amplifiers
 Cascade (chemical engineering), a series of chemical processes
 Cascade filling system, for gasses
 Cascade connection, a type of electrical network connection
 Cascade motor connection, a speed control system for induction motor

Places
 Cascade Range, a mountain range on the west coast of North America
 Cascade Creek (disambiguation)
 Cascade Falls (disambiguation)
 Cascade River (disambiguation)
 Yerevan Cascade

Australia
 Cascade, Norfolk Island, a settlement in the Australian external territory of Norfolk Island
 Cascades, Tasmania, a suburb of Hobart
 Cascade, Western Australia

Canada
 Cascade City, British Columbia, aka Cascade Falls, a ghost town
 Cascade Falls (Kettle River), the eponymous waterfall near Cascade City
 Cascade Inlet, a side-inlet of Dean Channel in the Central Coast region of British Columbia
 Cascade Falls (Iskut River), waterfall in the Stikine-Iskut region of British Columbia
 Cascade Falls Regional Park, located on Cascade Creek northeast of the District of Mission in the Lower Mainland region of British Columbia

United States
 Cascades (ecoregion), an area of Washington, Oregon, and California
 Cascade, California, an unincorporated community in Plumas County
 Cascade, Colorado
 Cascade, Idaho
 Lake Cascade, a reservoir in Idaho
 Cascade, Indiana, an unincorporated community
 Cascade, Iowa, a city in Dubuque County and Jones County
 Cascade Township, Michigan
 Cascade Township, Olmsted County, Minnesota
 Cascade, Missouri
 Cascade, Montana
 Cascade County, Montana
 Cascade, Nebraska
 Cascade, New Hampshire
 Cascade, Ohio, a former town in Putnam County
 Cascade Township, Lycoming County, Pennsylvania
 Cascade, Virginia, an unincorporated community
 Cascades, Virginia, a census-designated place in Loudoun County
 Cascade, Seattle, Washington
 Cascade-Fairwood, Washington, a census-designated place in King County
 Cascade, West Virginia, an unincorporated community
 Cascade, Wisconsin, a village in Sheboygan County

Elsewhere
 Cascade, Jamaica, a settlement in Jamaica
 Cascade, Seychelles, an administrative district of Seychelles
 Penpedairheol, Caerphilly, also known as "Cascade", South Wales, United Kingdom
 Cascade, a public housing estates in Ho Man Tin, Hong Kong

Organizations
 Cascade Brewery, a brewery founded in 1832 in Australia
 Cascade Communications, a communications equipment manufacturer
 Cascade Investment, a financial company
 Cascades (company), a paper pulp company, founded in 1957 in Canada
 Open Cascade, a software development company with head office in France

Arts and entertainment
 The Cascade, a Canadian newspaper, first published in 1993 in British Columbia
 [S] Cascade, a flash animation from the webcomic Homestuck

Music

Artists
 Cascade (band), a Japanese rock group, who formed in 1993
 Cascade, a former name of the German dance group Cascada
 Cascade, a British DJ duo also recording under the alias Transa

Albums
 Cascade, a 1984 album by Capercaillie
Cascade, a 1986 album recorded by Terry Oldfield
 Cascade (Peter Murphy album), a 1995 album by Peter Murphy
 Cascade (Guy Manning album), a 2001 album by Guy Manning
 Cascade, a 2009 album by Abaddon Incarnate
 Cascade (William Basinski album), a 2015 album by William Basinski

Songs
 "Cascade", a song written by Gene Slone and played by Chet Atkins on his 1977 album Me and My Guitar
 "Cascade", a song by Spyro Gyra from the 1978 album Spyro Gyra
 "Cascade", a song by Siouxsie and the Banshees from the 1982 album A Kiss in the Dreamhouse
 "Cascade" (song), a 1993 single by The Future Sound of London
 "Cascade", a song by Dave Weckl from the 2005 album Multiplicity
 "The Cascade", a song by Moving Mountains from the 2011 album Waves
 "Cascade", a song by Kreidler from the 2012 album Den

Transportation
 Cascade (train), a railroad train
 USS Cascade (AD-16), a 1942 ship

Other uses
 Cascade College, a former college in Oregon, US
 Cascade (juggling), a juggling pattern
 Cascade hop, an agricultural crop
 Jabot (window), also called a cascade, a type of interior decor
 Information cascade, when people use the actions of others as an input to their own actions
 Cascade, a household dishwashing detergent manufactured by Procter & Gamble

See also
 Cascades (disambiguation)
 Cascade Lake (disambiguation)
 KASCADE, a European physics experiment
 Kaskade (Ryan Gary Raddon, born 1971), American DJ
 Cascada (disambiguation)
 Cascadia (disambiguation)
 Collisional cascading (disambiguation)
 
 
 
 
 Cascode, a type of amplifier in electronics